Justice Emery may refer to:

Lucilius A. Emery (1840–1920), associate justice of the Maine Supreme Judicial Court
Nicholas Emery (1776–1861), associate justice of the Maine Supreme Judicial Court